The 2012 KNSB Dutch Super Sprint Championships in speed skating were held at the Ireen Wüst baan ice stadium in Tilburg, Netherlands at 18 February 2012.

Schedule

Medalist

Results

Senior Results

Junior A Results

Junior B Results

Junior C Results

References

KNSB Dutch Super Sprint Championships
KNSB Dutch Super Sprint Championships
2012 Super Sprint
Sports competitions in Tilburg